The Society for Economic Anthropology (SEA) is a group of anthropologists, archaeologists, economists, geographers and other scholars interested in the connections between economics and social life. Its members take a variety of approaches to economics: some have a substantivist perspective, while others are interested in the new institutional economics. Every year the SEA holds a spring meeting focused on a specific topic in economic anthropology. The journal Economic Anthropology  is also produced annually, based on the meeting. The SEA is a section of the American Anthropological Association.

The society was founded in 1980. Harold K. Schneider served as the first president, from 1980 until 1982.

See also
Economic anthropology

Topics of recent spring meetings
2010 - Contested Economies: Global Tourism and Cultural Heritage. University of South Florida, Tampa, Florida
2009 - Weaving Across Time and Space: The Political Economy of Textiles. University of California at Los Angeles, Los Angeles, California.
2008 - Cooperation, University of Cincinnati, Cincinnati, Ohio.
2007 - The Political Economy of Hazards and Disasters, University of North Carolina at Greensboro, Greensboro, North Carolina.
2006 – Economics and Morality. California State  University, Channel Islands, Ventural California.
2005 - Economies and the Transformation of Landscape. Dartmouth College. Hanover, New Hampshire.
2004 - Fast Food - Slow Food: Social and Economic Contexts of Food and Food Systems,Decatur, Georgia
2003 - Migration and Economy, Monterrey, Mexico
2002 - Valuables, Goods, Wealth and Money, Toronto, Canada
2001 - Labor, Milwaukee, WI
2000 - Gender in Economic Life, Indiana University, Bloomington, Indiana
1999 - Development Beyond the 20th Century: A Critical Discussion in Economic Anthropology, Texas A&M University, College Station, Texas
1998 - Theory in Economic Anthropology, Chicago, Illinois

Titles of recent volumes
Vol. 25: Economies and the Transformation of Landscape. Lisa Cliggett and Chris Poole, eds. In Progress.
Vol. 24: Fast-Food, Slow-Food. Rick Wilk, ed. 2007
Vol. 23: Labor in Cross-Cultural Perspective. (Paul Durrenberger and Judith Marti, eds.) Alta Mira 2006.
Vol. 22: Migration and Economy: Global and Local Dynamics. Lillian Trager, ed. Alta Mira 2005.

External links
Society for Economic Anthropology wiki and website
AltaMira press, the publisher of the annual volumes
The Society for Economic Anthropology Home page

Anthropology organizations
Economic anthropology
Articles lacking reliable references from October 2017